John Gerard Duffy (24 August 1929 – 4 May 2004) was a Scottish footballer who played as a wing half in junior football for St Anthony's, in the Scottish League for Celtic and Arbroath, and in the English Football League for Southend United, for whom he made more than 100 appearances.

References

1929 births
2004 deaths
Footballers from Dundee
Scottish footballers
Association football wing halves
Hill of Beath Hawthorn F.C. players
St Anthony's F.C. players
Celtic F.C. players
Arbroath F.C. players
Southend United F.C. players
Scottish Junior Football Association players
Scottish Football League players
English Football League players